Il Cromuele (The Cromwell) is a tragedy in five acts, released in 1671. It was conceived and written by Girolamo Graziani, through the sixties of the 17th century, in Modena, during the troubled reign of Laura Martinozzi.

Genesis 
The first information on the composition of the Il Cromuele appears in the preface to Graziani's Varie Poesie e Prose (1662).

Since 1666 the writing of Il Cromuele is accompanied by an extensive correspondence with Jean Chapelain, as Graziani was waged by Colbert on behalf of Louis The Great.

Plot
Henrighetta, Queen of England has escaped from Cromuele, the tyrant usurper who imprisoned her husband king Carlo in the Tower of London. 
After useless petitions to the Government of Edinburgh and to the of Republic of the Seven United Netherlands, she has sailed towards France in order to ask for help by her nephew Louis XIV.

She is with Delmira, a young Irish girl just known during the trip. The two women, for their security, are travelling with male clothes, as Dutch Merchants. During the voyage, their ship has been wrecked, and their lifeboat was pushed by the wind to English coast, from where they reached London under the identities of Henrico (Henry) and Edmondo (Edmund).

In this guise, they have been housed in the Palace of Odoardo (Edward) and Anna Hide, a family in pectore still loyalist despite it shows fidelity to the usurper Cromuele. The beauty and the singing qualities of Edmondo/Delmira, have meant that the two women were both introduced in Whitehall to attend a major Costume party that Cromuele has ordered, to distract Londoners from the consequences of his despotic government and a looming plague.

So far the Backstory. With the arrival at Palace Edmondo/Delmira and Henrico/Henrighetta tragedy begins.

It's the eve of King's decapitation. The death sentence has not yet been issued. Elisabetta (Elizabeth), the wife of Cromuele, wants her husband to postpone the decision because she's secretly in love with the King.
Her confidant Orinda, an elder widow sensitive to love affairs, combines her clandestine meeting with Carlo within the prison, where Elisabetta will be able to offer him clemency in change of love.

To arrange such an encounter, Orinda asks for help to Edmondo/Delmira (of which, thinking she's a boy, fell in love) and to Henrico/Henrighetta, reassured by their seeming foreigner.

The two heroines take this opportunity to free Carlo, with the help of Odoardo and Anna Hide, 
to which in the meantime have revealed their true identities. But the discovery of the conspiracy precipitates the fate of Carlo which is executed at dawn as well as Edmondo/Delmira who, dying, has time to prove her identity, and through some details of her story, Orinda supposes to recognize her daughter, sent abroad when very young, to save her from a prophecy of die at home by relatives. Overwhelmed with grief, Orinda commits suicide on what she believes to be her daughter's corpse.

After the regicide. Cromuele can finally sleep, but his sleep is interrupted by a nightmare in which Mary Stuart heralds the end of his power. Upon awakening, Cromuele receives the glad tidings of the existence of a newborn daughter believed dead, but actually still alive because exchanged with Orinda's one while in bassinet.

But his happiness is short-lived because the anagnorisis plunges him into utter turmoil, when he discovers that his beloved daughter 
was actually the Edmondo/Delmira he has just executed.

Il Cromuele between history and fiction 
 With the Restoration,  on the anniversary of the regicide the corpse of Oliver Cromwell had been exhumed and subjected to Posthumous execution.  In the  year of the publication of  Il Cromuele,  his head was still exposed in Westminster. The event is evoked through the premonition of  Mary Stuart.
Also appearing in the play, or are mentioned in their proper political position, generals of  the New Model Army such as  John Lambert (Lamberto), Henry Ireton (Iretone), Thomas Harrison (Harrisone) and Thomas Fairfax (Farfasse).
 Even the two characters only required by the fiction, and therefore presented only with their first name, have a precise reference to history or to contemporary chronicle. The death of Delmira caused by her father Cromuele, plunges him in total despair, and Orinda elderly widow but hypersensitive to matters of love, becomes herself a victim of love, even if Platonic, for a woman. They both recalled the viewer and the contemporary reader to real people: The first is a direct quote to the favorite daughter of Cromwell, Elizabeth Claypole that had broken off relations with her father not forgiving him his murderous methods. Elizabeth died when she was 29, as well as Delmira, and her death after a long and painful illness, seemed having given the fatal blow to the health of her father, who actually died a month later. The episode struck the imagination of his contemporaries who found in it a form of nemesis for regicide committed. The second, Orinda is a direct reference to the Welsh poet Katherine Philips, whose poetic production concerned only about love, marriage, on love relationships in general, arousing interest and scandal for her theories on Love between women, and whose pen name was The Matchless Orinda.

Performance history 
The Preface to the second edition of Il Cromuele (1673), shows no trace of its premiere. There is also no trace in the rich documentation in the Este's National Archives in Modena.

The cause of the probable non-representation is the dynastic marriage which occurred in 1673 (then only two years after the first publication) between Maria Beatrice d'Este and James Stuart, the latter newly widowed by that Anne Hyde with whom, in the Il Cromuele, he appears in love. A presence unwieldy for Graziani, who as Secretary of State, was keeping the interests of the House of Este in the marriage.

In contemporary times, Il Cromuele has been represented in Piacenza in the theatre season 1996–97 by Piacenza's Company Gli Infidi Lumi,  directed by Stefano Tomassini, music by Massimo Berzolla.

Editions 
 Bologna, Manolessi, 1671 in -4°
 Modena, Soliani, 1671 in -12°
 Bologna, Manolessi, 1673 in -4°
 [Piacenza], Infidi Lumi Edizioni, 1997 (out of print edition, theater adaptation by Stefano Tomassini)
 Pisa, Edizioni della Normale, 2011, in: Storie Inglesi, l'Inghilterra vista dall'Italia tra storia e romanzo (XVIII sec.) edited by Clizia Carminati e Stefano Villani, pagg. 297 - 470.

Bibliography 
 Emilio Bertana, L'irregolarità del teatro profano: il «Cromuele» di Girolamo Graziani, in: Storia dei generi letterari italiani, la Tragedia, Milano, Vallardi, [1916?], pages 200–10.
 Piero Di Nepi, Girolamo Graziani e la politica come arte: «Cromuele», "F.M. Annali dell'Istituto di Filologia Moderna dell'Università di Roma, 2-1979, Roma, 1981, pages 113-24 (see Fulvio Bianchi in: "La Rassegna della Letteratura italiana" diretta da Walter Binni, sept.dec. 1982, pages 620–1).
 Rosa Galli Pellegrini, La Tragédie Italienne à l'école du classicisme Français: le rôle de Chapelain dans la genèse du "Cromuele" de Graziani, “Quaderni del Dipartimento di Lingue e Letterature Straniere Moderne, Università di Genova”,  2–1987, peges 35–57.
 Maurizio Fasce, Introduzione e note alle edizione de Il Cromuele, con la collaborazione di Carlo Alberto Girotto, Storie Inglesi, l'Inghilterra vista dall'Italia tra storia e romanzo (XVIII sec.), edited by Clizia Carminati e Stefano Villani, Edizioni della Normale, Pisa, 2011, pagg. 297 - 330.

References 

1671 plays
Plays about the English Civil War
Italian plays
Cultural depictions of Oliver Cromwell
Cultural depictions of Charles I of England
Cultural depictions of Mary, Queen of Scots
Tragedy plays
Anne Hyde
Henrietta Maria